Mimeoclysia is a genus of moths belonging to the subfamily Tortricinae of the family Tortricidae.

Species
Mimeoclysia dentata Diakonoff, 1953
Mimeoclysia incompertana Kuznetzov, 2003
Mimeoclysia mauroprosopa Diakonoff, 1984
Mimeoclysia mystrion Razowski, 2013
Mimeoclysia piridina Diakonoff, 1941
Mimeoclysia strongylopa Diakonoff, 1983

See also
List of Tortricidae genera

References

External links
tortricidae.com

Epitymbiini
Tortricidae genera